Māori Marsden (10 August 1924 – 18 June 1993) was an author, an ordained Anglican minister and expert (tohunga) on Māori philosophy.

Biography 
Marsden was born in Awanui, in the far north of New Zealand 10 August 1924. His parents were Hoani Matenga-Paerata and Hana (nee-Toi) Matenga-Paerata. Māori Marsden is affiliated with the Te Aupouri iwi, and also Ngāi Takoto, Ahipara, and Ngāti Warara of Ngāpuhi. His secondary education was at Wesley College in Paerata and he went to the University of Auckland and studied a Bachelor of Arts. He was also educated in the traditional Māori centre of learning 'Te Whare Wananga o Ngāpuhi. He was the chair-person of the Auckland University Māori Club while he was studying there. 

Marsden's father was a member of the clergy Reverend Hoani Matenga, and Marsden attended Auckland Bible Training Institute. Marsden also graduated from St. John’s College, Auckland in 1957 with a Licentiate in Theology. The same year at age 33 he became an Anglican minister.  

Marsden was in World War II from 1939 - 1945 as a member of the of the 28th Māori Battalion. He was the Royal New Zealand Navy chaplain for twelve years. He was the first Māori chaplain of the Navy. Researcher Robyn Tauroa says whilst Marsden was at the Navy he 'provided karakia and also guided unuhia ceremonies to prepare Māori for battle'.    

Marsden's essay God, Man and Universe, published in Te Ao Hurihuri (1975) has been described as a 'seminal work'. As a writer Marsden wrote about 'matters facing the contemporary Māori quest for social justice and the achievement of authentic being.' Marsden also composed waiata, and was a guest speakers at many events.

Publications 
Te Ao Hurihuri (1975) 
Māori Illness and Healing (1986)
Resource Management Law Reform (1989) 
Kaitiakitanga: A Definitive Introduction to the Holistic World View of the Māori (1992) co-authored with T. A. Henare
The Woven Universe: Selected Writings of Rev. Maori Marsden (2003) edited by Te Ahukaramū Charles Royal, produced by the Royal Society Te Apārangi and Ngā Pae o te Māramatanga

Death 
On 18 June 1993 Marsden died at his residence (the old hospital) in Te Kōpuru.

References

External links 
He Rerenga Kōrero 1985 speech by Rev Māori Marsden before the Waitangi Tribunal on the Ōrākei Marae in support of Ngāti Whātua's claim for the return of their land at Bastion Point.

 
1924 births
1993 deaths
People from the Northland Region
Te Aupōuri people
Ngāpuhi people
University of Auckland alumni
New Zealand clergy
New Zealand military personnel of World War II
Anglican clergy in New Zealand
Tohunga